is a Japanese voice actress from Tokyo. She is affiliated with Sun Music Production.

Filmography

Anime television
Red Garden (2006), Mary, Mireille
Penguindrum (2011), Female fan 1, Passenger A, Librarian, Girl, Boy
Chitose Get You!! (2012), Kouhai-sensei
From the New World (2012), Ryō Inaba
Gon (2012), Pūsuke, Sū, Prairie dog, Baby Elephant
Hiiro no Kakera: The Tamayori Princess Saga (2012), Osaki-ko
Hiiro no Kakera: The Tamayori Princess Saga Season 2 (2012), Osaki-ko
Lagrange: The Flower of Rin-ne (2012), Sachi Nogami
Lagrange: The Flower of Rin-ne Season 2 (2012), Sachi Nogami, Michi Kondō
Lego Friends: The Tale of Sparkly Friends (2012), Stephanie
Ace of Diamond (2013), Takako Fujiwara, Field Announcer
Devil Survivor 2: The Animation (2013), Fumi Kanno
Freezing Vibration (2013), Charles Bonaparte
Neppu Kairiku Bushi Road (2013), Saki
Outbreak Company (2013), Edward Theodore Pertini, Luna
Akame ga Kill! (2014), Monjirō
Baby Steps (2014), Yuki, Announcer
Gonna be the Twin-Tail!! (2014), Kotori Tarui, Female student B
Mobile Suit Gundam-san (2014), Fraw-san
Persona 4: The Animation (2014), Nozomi
Sakura Trick (2014), Third year female student
Yona of the Dawn (2014), Girl, Medical official, Mother, Taso's Wife, Villager, Wind Clan Member, Woman, Young lady
Ace of Diamond: Second Season (2015), Takako Fujiwara, Field Announcer
Lance N' Masques (2015), Francois Ming
Nyuru Nyuru!! Kakusen-kun Season 2 (2015), Yamaguchi
Rampo Kitan: Game of Laplace (2015), Narrator, Nurse, Copycat Criminal, Helicopter Reporter
Unlimited Fafnir (2015), Miyako Shinomiya
YuruYuri San Hai! (2015), Takane Dezaki
Bakuon!! (2016), Hijiri Minowa
Black Clover (2017), Rebecca Scarlet 
Hulaing Babies (2019), Shiina

OVA
Rinne no Lagrange: Kamogawa Days (2012), Sachi Nogami
Neppu Kairiku Bushi Road (2013), Saki
Bakuon!! (2016), Hijiri Minowa

Video games
Corpse Party: Blood Drive (2014), Aiko Niwa

Anime Film
Alice in Dreamland (2015), Tweedledum, Tweedledee

Dubbing
Freaky, Sandra (Emily Holder)
The Marksman, Rosa (Teresa Ruiz)

References

External links
 
 Official Agency Profile

Japanese voice actresses
Living people
People from Tokyo
1988 births